Franciszek Gąsienica Groń (30 September 1931 – 31 July 2014) was a Polish Nordic combined athlete who competed in the 1950s. He won a bronze medal in the Nordic combined at the 1956 Winter Olympics in Cortina d'Ampezzo. He was the first Polish athlete to win a Winter Olympics medal in any Nordic skiing discipline (cross-country skiing, ski jumping, and Nordic combined).

He was born in Zakopane.

References

External links
 
 

1931 births
2014 deaths
Polish male Nordic combined skiers
Nordic combined skiers at the 1956 Winter Olympics
Olympic Nordic combined skiers of Poland
Olympic bronze medalists for Poland
Sportspeople from Zakopane
Olympic medalists in Nordic combined
Medalists at the 1956 Winter Olympics
20th-century Polish people